Jean-Luc Benoziglio (19 November 1941 – 5 December 2013) was a Swiss-French writer and publishing editor.

Born in Monthey, Valais, Benoziglio studied at the University of Lausanne before dropping out. Among the features of Benoziglios works include: black humor and influences of the Nouveau roman and Oulipo.

Jean-Luc Benoziglio died on 5 December 2013, aged 72, in Paris, France, where he had lived since 1967.

Personal life
Benoziglio was born in Switzerland to a Turkish father and an Italian mother.

Bibliography
1972 – Quelqu'un bis est mort
1973 – Le Midship
1974 – La Boîte noire
1976 – Béno s'en va-t-en guerre
1978 – L'Écrivain fantôme
1980 – Cabinet-portrait (Prix Médicis 1980)
1986 – Le Jour où naquit Kary Karinaky
1989 – Tableaux d'une ex
1991 – La Pyramide ronde
1993 – Peinture avec pistolet
1998 – Le Feu au lac
1999 – Peinture avec pistolet
2001 – La Pyramide ronde
2004 – La Voix des mauvais jours et des chagrins rentrés
2005 – Louis Capet, suite et fin

References

External links
 

1941 births
2013 deaths
People from Monthey
Swiss expatriates in France
Swiss journalists
Swiss male novelists
Swiss writers in French
Swiss people of Turkish descent
Swiss people of Italian descent
20th-century Swiss novelists
21st-century Swiss novelists
20th-century male writers
21st-century male writers
Prix Médicis winners